Narestan is a village in Razavi Khorasan Province, Iran.

Narestan or Narsetan may also refer to:
 Narestan, Bushehr
 Narestan, Yazd
 Narsetan, Zanjan
 Narestan Rural District, in Yazd Province